Ruby-Spears Productions (also known as Ruby-Spears Enterprises) was an American entertainment production company that specialized in animation based in Burbank, California, with another branch in Rome, Italy. The company was founded in 1977 by veteran writers and Scooby-Doo, Where Are You! creators Joe Ruby and Ken Spears.

History 
Ruby and Spears started out as sound editors at Hanna-Barbera and later branched out into story-writing for such programs as Space Ghost and The Herculoids. In 1969, they were assigned the task of developing a mystery-based cartoon series for Saturday mornings, the result of which was Scooby-Doo, Where Are You! They left Hanna-Barbera shortly after because "they were having a hard time moving up" and wanted to be "associate producers". They were also writers and producers for DePatie–Freleng Enterprises, particularly for The Barkleys and The Houndcats.

Ruby-Spears Productions was founded in 1977 while Ruby and Spears were network executives at ABC supervising the Saturday morning programming. ABC Entertainment president Fred Silverman wanted to create competition for Hanna-Barbera, which then provided the bulk of the Saturday morning content for all three major networks. Silverman was concerned the studio was stretching their projects too thin, diluting the quality of their series, requiring competition. The company's first breakout was The Puppy Who Wanted a Boy. The company's credits include the animated series Fangface, Goldie Gold and Action Jack, The Plastic Man Comedy/Adventure Show, Thundarr the Barbarian, Rubik, the Amazing Cube, the 1983 version of the Alvin and the Chipmunks series, Mister T, Sectaurs, The Centurions, the 1988 Superman series, the Police Academy animated series and the American Mega Man cartoon series.

Joe Ruby's and Ken Spears' favorite Ruby-Spears-produced show was Thundarr the Barbarian.

Only two pre-1991 series, Police Academy: The Animated Series and Piggsburg Pigs!, used Canadian rather than American voice talent like most of their other cartoons. Ruby-Spears was also responsible for the animated sequence in the 1988 film Child's Play and replaying the sequence as a fictional commercial in the 1991 sequel Child's Play 3.

The Ruby-Spears studio was founded in 1977 as a subsidiary of Filmways (later Orion Pictures) and sold in late 1981—4 years later—to Taft Broadcasting, becoming a sister company to Hanna-Barbera. In 1991, Ruby-Spears was spun off into RS Holdings. Most of the pre-1991 Ruby-Spears Productions library was sold along with Hanna-Barbera to Turner Broadcasting System, which in turn merged with Time Warner (now Warner Bros. Discovery) in 1996. The Ruby-Spears studio closed in 1996 after 19 years of operation. As of now, most of the original pre-1991 Ruby-Spears Productions library is now held by Warner Bros., through Hanna-Barbera, Warner Bros. Animation and Warner Bros. Family Entertainment. The only pre-1991 Ruby-Spears Productions library not owned by Warner Bros. is Rambo: The Force of Freedom, which is owned and distributed by StudioCanal which also own and distribute the first three live-action Rambo films.

As of 2019, it is unclear where Ruby-Spears' post-1991 library is held; two exceptions are the Mega Man series, which is at least partially owned by WildBrain, and Skysurfer Strike Force, which is owned by Invincible Entertainment Group, along with most of the Bohbot Entertainment library.

The founders both died in 2020 within three months of each other – Joe Ruby died of natural causes on August 26 at the age of 87 and Ken Spears died of complications from Lewy body dementia on November 6 at age 82.

See also 
 List of Ruby-Spears productions

References 

 
1977 establishments in California
1996 disestablishments in California
American companies established in 1977
American companies disestablished in 1996
American animation studios
Italian animation studios
Animation duos
Mass media companies established in 1977
Mass media companies disestablished in 1996
Film production companies of the United States
Television production companies of the United States
Companies based in Burbank, California
Taft Broadcasting
Hanna-Barbera
1981 mergers and acquisitions
Filmways
Turner Broadcasting System